The finswimming events at the 2009 Southeast Asian Games were held from 15 December to 17 December in Vientiane, Laos. The Events were held at the Aquatic Center of the National Sports Complex.

Medal summary

Events

Men

50m surface
December 16 - FINAL
FINAL

100m surface
December 15 - FINAL
FINAL

200m surface
  - Bounthanom Vongphachani

  - Nguyen Hoan Hao

  - Petrol Apostle Kambey

400m surface
December 15 - FINAL
FINAL

800m Surface
  - Hans Hafner Yosaputra

  - Pham Van Tien
  
  - Petrol Apostle Kambey

100m bi-fins

December 16 - FINAL
FINAL

4 x 100m surface
December 15 - FINAL
FINAL

4 x 100m bi-fins

Women

50m surface
December 16 - FINAL
FINAL

100m surface
December 15 - FINAL
FINAL

200m surface
  - Nguyen Thi Quynh

  - Angeline Soegianto

  - Chu Thi Minh Thuy

400m surface
December 16 - FINAL
FINAL

800m Surface
December 15 - FINAL
FINAL

100m bi-fins
December 16 - FINAL
FINAL

4 x 100m surface
December 15 - FINAL
FINAL

4 x 100m bi-fins
  - Lane 3 -  - 03:35.06

  - Lane 4 -  - 03:38.88
  
  - Lane 5 -  - 04:22.05

References

External links
Official Result of the 25th Southeast Asian Games Vientiane 2009
 25th SEA Games Laos Official Report 

2009 Southeast Asian Games events
Finswimming at multi-sport events
Aquatics at the 2009 Southeast Asian Games